ISO 31-6 is the part of international standard ISO 31 that defines names and symbols for quantities and units related to light and related electromagnetic radiations. It is superseded by ISO 80000-7.

Its definitions include:

00031-06